In Australia, Political Groups (also known as Group Tickets, or simply Groups) are temporary associations made for the purpose of forming a ticket for elections to the upper houses of Australia, most notably the Australian Senate. In most upper houses and the ACT Legislative Assembly, elections are done under a special form of the Single Transferable Voting system in which a voter can vote for each candidate or a one political group of candidates. These groups are unsurely dissolve after the election is over, especially if one is made by an independent candidate or a group of independents. They are very similar to parties in many respects except the name. Political parties unsurely forms their own group tickets under the party name, with changes ranging from major (replacing an entire group with new candidates) to minor (replacing one or two, or raising the position of a lower listed candidate to a higher position in the group) after each election.

Example: 2013 federal election
An example of groups are those running for the Australia Senate in the 2013 election. They are as follows:

New South Wales

 Group F (Andrew Whalan)
 Group AG (Tom Wang)

Victoria

 Group T (Joseph Toscano)
 Group AJ (Bob Nicholls)

Queensland

 Keioskie/Taylor
 Rudd/Dinsey

Western Australia

None in this election

South Australia

 Nick Xenophon Group (Ticket 1)
 Nick Xenophon Group (Ticket 2)
 Group I (Ribnga Green)
 Group L (Dianah Mielgich)

Tasmania

None in this election

ACT and NT

See also

Politics of Australia

References

Politics of Australia